Mount Mawma(Maumae) is one of the most beautiful mountain in Mizoram state of north-east India and the 6th highest mountain within Mara Autonomous District Council. It is near the town of Chakhei, where a well-furnished guest-house is located. Mount Mawma is 6017 feet ( 1834 metre) above sea level.

In the local language, it is known as Maumae Tlah (Mount Maumae). To climb it, one needs special permission from the Indian Mountaineering Federation.

References

Mountains of Mizoram